Kelly Llorenna (born 1975) is an English dance music singer, who was born in Slough, Berkshire and raised in Oldham, Greater Manchester. She is best known as the former lead vocalist for the dance group N-Trance in the 1990s. Their biggest hit was "Set You Free", which made the UK top five in early 1995. Since then she has had six UK top 10 singles.

Biography

1992–1994: Debut with N-Trance
After attending stage school for a short time, Kelly Llorenna started her music career in 1992 as part of the dance act N-Trance, providing vocals to "Set You Free" which originally was not a success. Following several re-releases, the song reached number 2 in the UK Singles Chart in January 1995.

1995–2000: Solo debut and return to N-Trance
In 1995, Llorenna released her first solo track entitled "Brighter Day". An accompanying video was created but was released for promotional purposes only. She also recorded a cover version of "One Day I'll Fly Away", but this was never released.

In 1997, Llorenna returned to N-Trance for their cover version of the Rod Stewart hit record "Da Ya Think I'm Sexy" which reached number 7 in the UK chart. She also contributed as an uncredited vocalist on several other N-Trance tracks including "The Mind of the Machine", "Tears in the Rain" and "Shake Ya Body". "Set You Free" was released for the fourth time on the All Around The World record label in 2001, this time reaching number 4 in the chart.

2001–2006: Second solo career
In 2001, Llorenna teamed up with Flip & Fill to record a cover version of "True Love Never Dies", co-written by then-Darlington based Tom Cullimore, which reached number 34 in the UK chart, although it was re-released in 2002 and reached number 7. She re-launched her solo career with the label All Around The World in 2002 with a cover of the Taylor Dayne track, "Tell It to My Heart". A new version of a previous track "Heart of Gold" was also released the same year, charting at 19 in the UK chart.

A solo album was released which included five singles and seven new tracks. Many of the tracks on the album were produced and written with Flip & Fill, along with some of her own writing contributions. In 2002, another single by N-Trance entitled "Forever" was released which reached number 6, giving her fifth Top 10 hit. In 2003, "Destiny" was released by N-Trance charting at number 37, but this was to be her final collaborative effort with them for some time due to working difficulties.

In 2004, she reached number 15 in the UK chart with a cover of Donna Summer's, "This Time I Know It's for Real". A new track entitled "Nobody Like You" was recorded by her in 2005, along with a video, but was never released. In 2007, she released a cover of Lara Fabian's, "I Will Love Again", which did not reach the official UK chart.

2007–2008: Return to N-Trance
In 2007, she once again rejoined Kevin O'Toole of N-Trance to record the new tracks for their forthcoming album. Some of these tracks included "Nothing Lasts Forever" (released in 2009), "Stronger" (written specially for Kelly) and "You're My Angel". She also appeared on some of the tracks on their other new album – The Mind of the Machine which was originally due for release in the 1990s.

She has also been working with Love to Infinity on a number of new tracks for their forthcoming album, including "Hot Stuff" (a Donna Summer track), "Keep Love Together" (a previous Love to Infinity track) and "You Gotta Love Me" (a new creation).

2009: Return to solo career
She released her seventh solo track with All Around the World in 2009, which was a cover of the Madonna song, "Dress You Up". This track along with many others was sung on the Clubland Live tour at the end of 2008. It was announced by N-Trance that Llorenna had once again left the band in order to concentrate on her solo career. In Music Week magazine, it was announced that "Dress You Up" had reached number one in the upfront club chart, and that she will soon be releasing a new single with Love to Infinity.

2010: Freak Asylum
Llorenna has formed a new band with Love to Infinity, known as Freak Asylum, and worked with Peter Hook from New Order. Other collaborators on the Freak Asylum album include Toby Gad, Shane Gibson (Korn) and George Lynch (Lynch Mob).

Freak Asylum's album, Let the Madness Begin was to be released in 2011. Llorenna filmed videos for the Freak Asylum singles, "You Better Leave" "Fetish" and "Throwaway Girl".

Discography

Solo discography

Albums

Singles

Work with N-Trance
Please see N-Trance discography for more information.

Work with other artists
These tracks have been released as singles / have yet to be released as singles.

Other contributions
These tracks have not been released as singles.

See also
List of Eurodance artists
List of performers on Top of the Pops

References

External links

Kelly Llorenna
Myspace page
All Around the World biography

N-Trance
Official website

Love to Infinity
Official website

Freak Asylum
Official website

Living people
English women singers
Musicians from the Metropolitan Borough of Oldham
People from Oldham
People from Upminster
Trance singers
1975 births
English women in electronic music